The 2011–12 season is the 124th competitive association football season in India since the inaugural Durand Cup in 1888. The season began on the 8 September 2011 with the Federation Cup.

Promotion and Relegation

Teams relegated from I-League
 ONGC
 JCT

Teams promoted to I-League
 Shillong Lajong
 Sporting Clube de Goa

Events of the season

6 May 2011: Shillong Lajong make the first transfer of the season by transferring Anil Gurung to Nepali club Manang Marshyangdi Club.

2 June 2011: Mohun Bagan make the first big signing and maybe the biggest signing of the season by signing three time I-League golden boot winner Odafe Onyeka Okolie to a $320,000 a year deal.

7 June 2011: Chirag Computers expel their relationship with United Sports Club.

13 June 2011: Churchill Brothers make three of the next big signings of the season by signing both Roberto Mendes Silva and India internationals Jagpreet Singh and Xavier Vijay Kumar.

18 June 2011: Dempo make the fifth biggest signing of the season by signing Indian footballer golden boot runner-up Anil Kumar from Viva Kerala FC.

22 June 2011: Churchill Brothers make the sixth biggest signing of the season by signing Gabon international Henry Antchouet while Shillong Lajong make the seventh biggest signing of the season by signing Johnny Menyongar from United Sikkim.

29 June 2011: Viva Kerala FC rename themselves as Chirag United Club Kerala after signing a sponsorship deal.

7 July 2011: Pune retain Jeje Lalpekhlua from Indian Arrows after a one-year loan spell.

3 August 2011: United Sports Club is renamed Prayag United S.C. after signing a six-year sponsorship deal.

29 September 2011: Salgaocar win the 2011 Federation Cup with a 3–1 victory over last season's winners East Bengal.

18 October 2011: East Bengal win the 2011 Indian Super Cup over Salgaocar 9–8 in penalties after the match ended 0-0.

10 April 2012: HAL is officially relegated from the I-League after losing 4–6 to Pune at the Bangalore Football Stadium. This was further made true when Mumbai drew with Pailan Arrows. This means that on April 10 that HAL was 13 points below Mumbai who occupied the last 2012–13 I-League spot and with HAL at 23 games meant that HAL could only win 9 points.

Clubs Removed
 JCT, folded due to financial difficulties.

Name Changes
 Chirag United → United Sports Club
 Viva Kerala FC → Chirag United Club Kerala
 United Sports Club → Prayag United

India national football team

2011 SAFF Cup

Friendlies

2014 FIFA World Cup Qualification

I-League

See also
 2011–12 I-League
 2011 Indian Federation Cup
 India national football team

References

 
Seasons in Indian football